Spaniard's Bay is a natural bay off the island of Newfoundland in the province of Newfoundland and Labrador, Canada.  It extends from Conception Bay into the northern section of the Avalon Peninsula.

References

Bays of Newfoundland and Labrador